is the third live album by Japanese idol duo Pink Lady. Recorded live during their Christmas concert at the Nippon Budokan on December 27, 1977, the album was released on March 5, 1978.

The album peaked at No. 5 on Oricon's weekly albums chart and sold over 94,000 copies.

Track listing

Charts

References

External links

 
 

1978 live albums
Pink Lady (band) live albums
Albums recorded at the Nippon Budokan
Japanese-language live albums
Victor Entertainment live albums